Wattersite is a rare mercury chromate mineral with the formula Hg+14Hg+2Cr+6O6. It occurs in association with native mercury and cinnabar in a hydrothermally altered serpentinite. It was first described from Clear Creek claim, San Benito County, California, USA in 1961.  It was named to honor Californian mineral collector Lucius "Lu" Watters.

References

Oxide minerals
Mercury minerals
Chromium minerals
Monoclinic minerals
Minerals in space group 15